Ekaterina Likoshin (Russian: Екатерина Ликошин; fl. 1800–1810) was a Russian pianist and composer who published short works for keyboard in St. Petersburg through publisher F.A. Dittmar. She is thought to have been employed by Count Uvarov.

Works
Selected works include:

Six polonaises et dix écossaises
Fragmens de mon passé temps contenants differentes danses

References

Musicians from Saint Petersburg
19th-century classical composers
Russian women classical composers
Russian classical composers
Date of birth unknown
Date of death unknown
Year of birth unknown
Year of death unknown
19th-century women composers